Gmina Wilków may refer to either of the following rural administrative districts in Poland:
Gmina Wilków, Opole Voivodeship
Gmina Wilków, Lublin Voivodeship